Orient Airways Ltd. was an airline established in 1946 with its base in Calcutta, Bengal, British India. The airline shifted operations to the newly independent state of Pakistan in 1947, and was rechristened as Pakistan International Airlines in 1955. It was the first and only Muslim owned airline in British Raj and flew from 1947 to 1955.

History
The airline was registered in Calcutta, British Raj on 23 October 1946. The initial investment was provided by the Ispahani, Adamjee, and the Arag group. Mirza Ahmad Ispahani, being its first chairman, and Air Vice-Marshal O.K. Carter, the general manager, obtained an operating license in May 1947. Four Douglas DC-3s were obtained from Temple, Texas in February 1947 and operations first started on 4 June 1947. The designated route was Kolkata-Sittwe (then known as Akyab)-Yangon (Myanmar), which also happened to be the first post-war international operation to be flown by an airline registered in the British Raj.

Orient Airways, along with the help of some chartered BOAC aircraft, started relief operations and transportation of the population between Delhi and Karachi, the capitals of India and Pakistan, respectively. Later, Orient Airways transferred its base to Pakistan and established the vital link between Karachi and Dhaka (Dacca). With a skeleton fleet of just two DC-3s, three crew, and twelve mechanics, Orient Airways re-launched its scheduled operations. The initial routes were Karachi-Lahore-Peshawar, Karachi-Quetta-Lahore, and Karachi-Delhi-Kolkata-Dhaka. By the end of 1949, Orient Airways had acquired 10 DC-3s and 3 Convair 240s which it operated on these particular routes. In 1950, it had become increasingly apparent that additional capacity would have to be inducted to cater to the growing needs of the population.

On 11 March 1955, the government of Pakistan merged Orient Airways with other airlines to form Pakistan International Airlines.

Livery 
Orient Airways aircraft had a green strip with the word "Orient Airways" or "Orient Skyliner". The tail was marked with the flag of Pakistan after the independence on 14 August 1947.

Fleet 

Orient Airways aircraft fleet consisted of the following aircraft. The aircraft had only Economy Class.

Former fleet

Services

Routes 
The following return routes were advised by the Board (1948):

 1. Karachi-Quetta-Lahore
 2. Karachi-Lahore-Rawalpindi-Peshawar
 3. Karachi-Delhi-Allahabad-Calcutta-Dacca-Chittagong
 4. Karachi-Ahmedabad-Bombay
 5. Karachi-Quetta-Zahidan-Meshad-Tehran

Other routes operating 

 1. Karachi-Dacca-Delhi-Karachi (daily service since March 1952)
 2. Karachi-Dacca via Lahore (not sure if it stopped in Lahore on both legs)
 3. Karachi-Multan-Lahore & Return (1952)
 5. Karachi-Delhi-Calcutta-?? (1949)

Airmail 
Orient Airways was the designated local carrier for airmail throughout the country. It also carried mail to India. Its services to Dacca were supplemented by BOAC's.

Accidents and incidents 
Orient Airways experienced has lost only two aircraft in crashes in 1952 and 1953 respectively.

1950s

 In October 1952, Orient Airways carrying cargo flight from Karachi to Dacca was crashed. There were only one of 3 was killed in this crash.
 On Monday 3 August 1953, the Douglas DC-3 registered AP-AAD operated on a hajj flight, carrying pilgrims from Karachi to Jeddah via Sharjah and Bahrain. The leg to Bahrain was to be flown by the first officer from the left-hand seat. Shortly after takeoff the aircraft entered a steep descending turn. The captain took over control but could not recover the aircraft. The Douglas DC-3 struck the ground. There were only one of 25 was killed in this crash. "The accident resulted from the loss of control of the aircraft by the first officer shortly after taking off on a dark night when instrument flying was necessary. This loss of control was due to the inability of the first officer to fly on instruments. The responsibility for the accident is attributed to the captain for failing to supervise the piloting of the aircraft by the first officer."

See also
 Adamjee Group

References

Defunct airlines of Pakistan
Airlines established in 1947
Airlines disestablished in 1955
1947 establishments in India
Pakistan International Airlines
1955 disestablishments in Pakistan
Mergers and acquisitions of Pakistani companies
1955 mergers and acquisitions